= Light booth =

A light booth is an apparatus which simulates lighting conditions. This apparatus is used to test products under a variety of lighting conditions, meaning that the user can accurately show how that product will appear under a variety of conditions independent of environmental influences. Light booths are primarily used in the painting industry to test the finish of products under controlled conditions.
